Charles Edward McCormick (May 8, 1946 – April 12, 2022) was an American musician. He was best known as the bassist,  founding member, and one of the lead singers of the American R&B/soul and funk band Bloodstone.

Early and personal life
McCormick was born and raised in Kansas City, Missouri, United States. He was the younger brother of well-known Los Angeles newsman and disc jockey, Larry McCormick. He studied music at Central High School, Kansas City. While still in high school, McCormick helped his friend, Harry Williams form a singing group called the Sinceres in 1962, which would later become Bloodstone. He also served in the army for two and a half years.

Career 
Following the formation of The Sinceres, McCormick and the rest of the group toured with a horn band known as the Soulful Emeralds in the late sixties. As the group evolved, they learned to play instruments and became a band. They developed a signature sound that combined sophisticated vocals and instrumentation with elements of funk and rock. By 1971, the band had relocated to England and changed its name to Bloodstone. The band consisted of McCormick on bass and vocals, Williams and Roger Durham on percussions and vocals, Charles Love and Willis Draffen on guitars and vocals, and Melvin Webb on drums. Webb would later be replaced by Eddie Summers. The band would chart thirteen songs between 1973 and 1984, with the McCormick-penned "Natural High" being their biggest hit, reaching the Top Ten on both R&B and pop charts in 1973, becoming their defining song. The group also went through several personnel changes through the years; McCormick left Bloodstone in 1982 and he was replaced by Ron Wilson. Between 1981 and 1984, McCormick recorded and released two singles as a solo artist. He rejoined Bloodstone in 1984. The band continued to play live, though most of the original members died through the years; Durham died in 1973, Webb died in 1982, Draffen died in 2002, Love died in 2014, and McCormick followed in 2022. The sole surviving original member is Williams.

Death 
McCormick died on April 12, 2022, aged 75, in Los Angeles, California, United States. He is survived by his siblings, children, grandchildren and great-grandchildren.

Discography

With Bloodstone 
The following albums listed below feature McCormick's work with Bloodstone.
Bloodstone (1972)
Natural High (1973)
Unreal (1973)
I Need Time (1974)
Riddle of the Sphinx (1974)
Train Ride to Hollywood (1975)
Do You Wanna Do a Thing (1976)
Lullaby of Broadway (1976)
Don't Stop! (1978)
Bloodstone's Greatest Hits (1985)
Now!... That's What I'm Talkin' About (2004)

Solo

Album 
 Many Moods of Charlie Mack (2012)

Singles 
"Now You Cry / I Want You For Myself" (1981)
"Live Wire" (1984)

Filmography 
Train Ride to Hollywood (1975)

References

External links 

 
 
 Charles McCormick at Discogs

1946 births
2022 deaths
American musicians
Ballad musicians
African-American male singer-songwriters
American rhythm and blues singers
American rhythm and blues singer-songwriters
Singer-songwriters from Missouri
20th-century African-American male singers
American soul singers
Decca Records artists
Motown artists
Warner Records artists
Musicians from Kansas City, Missouri